Now, More Than Ever is an album by Jim Guthrie. It was mastered by George Graves and sequenced by Kristian Galberg. Stephen Evans did the album's artwork.

An "extended edition", featuring a second disc of rarities, B-sides, and demo versions of some of the album's songs was released in 2010.

Track listing

Original
"Problem With Solutions"  – 4:34
"All Gone"  – 4:07
"So Small"  – 3:58
"Save It"  – 4:35
"Broken Chair"  – 4:05
"Lovers Do"  – 6:16
"Time Is a Force"  – 5:27
"Now, More Than Ever"  – 3:24
"The Evangelist"  – 5:10
"You Are Far (Do You Exist?)"  – 2:31

2010 bonus disc
 "Hug Me 'Til I'm Blue"
 "Time Is a Force (Demo)"
 "All Gone (String Only Mix)"
 "Lot to Learn"
 "Save It (8-Track Demo)"
 "Something Don't Feel Right"
 "Lovers Do (String Outro)"
 "So Small (4-Track Demo)"
 "All Gone (Slap Chop Mix)"
 "Wuthering Heights"
 "Love Hurts"
 "Ain't Got No/I Got Life"

Additional musicians
Bry Webb: Banjo
Mike Olsen: Cello
Andy Magoffin: Additional Percussion, Chanting 
Evan Clarke: Drums
Simon Osborne: Bass
Owen Pallett: Violins, Viola, String Arrangements
Laura May Elston: Sax, Flute, Clarinet (So Small)
Jamie Thompson: Second Kit (Now, More than Ever) 
Melanie Archibald: Lyrical influence (Save It)

Chart activity 
The album debuted on the Top 50 Albums from Canadian Campus/Community Radio Airplay at #14 on 28 November 2003, peaking on those charts at #3 position on 9 January 2004 and appearing for the final time the week of 19 March 2004. It spent a total of 8 weeks in the top 10.

Awards 
Now, More than Ever was nominated in the category Alternative Album of the Year at the 2005 Juno Awards.

References

2003 albums
Jim Guthrie (singer-songwriter) albums
Three Gut Records albums